Killingsworth may refer to:

Killingsworth (surname)
Killingsworth (album), a 2009 album by The Minus 5

See also
Killingworth (disambiguation)